The Eerste River, located in the Western Cape, South Africa, rises on Dwarsberg 60 km east of Cape Town at the head of Jonkershoek. The Eerste River catchment covers the eastern part of the Cape Flats lying to the west of the Hottentots Holland Mountains and south of the Tygerberg where the Kuils River tributary rises east of Kanonkop. The Eerste River is a short river; its length has been given as 40 km. The major tributary, Kuils River, is approximately 30 km long to its point of confluence with the Eerste River.

A population of the endangered local endemic Berg River Redfin (Pseudobarbus burgi) was found in the Eerste River. It has become extinct in recent times.

See also
 List of reservoirs and dams in South Africa
 List of rivers of South Africa

References 
 List of South African Dams from the Department of Water Affairs and Forestry (South Africa)

Rivers of the Western Cape